SS David B. Johnson was a Liberty ship built in the United States during World War II. She was named after David B. Johnson, the founder and first president of Winthrop University.

Construction
David B. Johnson was laid down on 23 November 1943, under a Maritime Commission (MARCOM) contract, MC hull 1511, by J.A. Jones Construction, Brunswick, Georgia; she was sponsored by Mai Rutledge Johnson, widow of David B. Johnson, and was launched on 13 January 1944.

History
She was allocated to the Wilmore Steamship Company, on 24 January 1944. On 18 November 1948, she was  laid up in the National Defense Reserve Fleet in Beaumont, Texas. On 2 July 1952, she was  laid up in the National Defense Reserve Fleet in Suisun Bay, California. On 2 January 1968, she was sold to the Nicolai Joffe Corp., for $49,576, for scrapping. She was withdrawn from the fleet on 17 January 1968.

References

Bibliography

 
 
 
 
 

 

Liberty ships
Ships built in Brunswick, Georgia
1944 ships
Beaumont Reserve Fleet
Suisun Bay Reserve Fleet